Thornapple River is a river in Sawyer and Rusk counties in the U.S. state of Wisconsin.

Among the tributaries of the Thornapple, there are two streams named Little Thornapple River.

Recreation

Largely undeveloped, the river is a popular destination for canoeing and kayaking. Small rapids and good fishing conditions are attractions.

References 

Rivers of Wisconsin
Rivers of Rusk County, Wisconsin
Rivers of Sawyer County, Wisconsin